Thongchai Sukkoki (born 17 August 1973) is a Thai former footballer and Thai football coach. He is the current manager of Thai League 2 club Nakhon Pathom United.

Managerial statistics

Honours

Manager
Nakhon Pathom United
 Thai League 3 Lower Region: 2019
 Thai League 4: 2018
 Thai League 4 Western Region: 2018

References

1973 births
Living people
Thongchai Sukkoki
Thongchai Sukkoki
Association football goalkeepers
Thongchai Sukkoki
Thongchai Sukkoki
Thongchai Sukkoki